The Open de Dijon was an annual professional golf tournament held at Golf de Dijon Bourgogne, near Bourgogne, France.

The tournament became part of the second tier Challenge Tour schedule in 1991, where it remained until 1996.

Winners

References

External links
Official coverage on the Challenge Tour's official site

Former Challenge Tour events
Golf tournaments in France